The 2014 Keio Challenger was a professional tennis tournament played on hard courts. It was the tenth edition of the tournament which is part of the 2014 ATP Challenger Tour. It took place in Yokohama, Japan between November 10 and November 16, 2014.

Singles main-draw entrants

Seeds

 1 Rankings are as of November 3, 2014.

Other entrants
The following players received wildcards into the singles main draw:
  Masato Shiga
  Manato Tanimoto
  Kaichi Uchida
  Kaito Uesugi

The following players received entry from the qualifying draw:
  Kim Young-seok
  Nam Ji-sung
  Shuichi Sekiguchi
  Takao Suzuki

The following player received entry by a lucky loser spot:
  Kim Cheong-eui

The following player received entry by a protected ranking:
  Greg Jones

Champions

Singles

  John Millman def.  Kyle Edmund, 6–4, 6–4

Doubles

  Bradley Klahn /  Matt Reid def.  Marcus Daniell /  Artem Sitak, 4–6, 6–4, [10–7]

External links
Official Website

 
Keio Challenger
Keio Challenger
Keio Challenger
Keio Challenger